Shusui Sekigawa (born 13 May 1913, date of death unknown) was a Japanese rower. He competed in the men's eight event at the 1936 Summer Olympics.

References

External links
 

1913 births
Year of death missing
Place of birth missing
Japanese male rowers
Olympic rowers of Japan
Rowers at the 1936 Summer Olympics